Greyscale is the eighth studio album by German synthpop band Camouflage. The record was released on 6 March 2015 in Germany and on 27 March 2015 in the rest of the world via Bureau B label. It is the band's first studio album in nine years, following 2006's Relocated. Greyscale peaked at #14 in the German charts.

Background 
Greyscale was recorded over a period of four years between 2011 and 2014. The album was first officially confirmed on 3 November 2013 as part of an announcement detailing the band's 30th anniversary plans, and was scheduled for a September 2014 release. However, due to delays in production and other events, the album was delayed until February 2015. Various snippets of new tracks were posted on the band's website throughout 2014. On 19 December 2014, details of the album's release were announced on the band's website.

Singles 
"Shine" was released as the lead single from Greyscale on 20 February 2015. The music video for the single premiered on 6 February 2015. "Shine" was first previewed at a live performance in 2011, along with the album track "Misery".
The second single from Greyscale, "Count on Me", was released on 9 October 2015.

Track listing

Review

—Modern Synthpop

References

External links
Official website

Camouflage (band) albums